Francisco Prío Socarrás  (29 March 1901 in Cuba – February 21, 1986 in Miami, Florida USA) was a Cuban attorney and politician.

Dr. Prío Socarrás was senator representing Cuba's Pinar del Río Province from 1944–1952.  His brother was Cuban President Carlos Prío Socarrás.  In 1952, when his brother was overthrown by Fulgencio Batista he and his family went into exile in Miami.  He later returned to Cuba when Fidel Castro overthrew Batista in 1959.  In late 1960, he grew discontented with the Castro government and returned to Miami.

He was married to Julia Alvarez Hernandez and he had one son, Fernando Prio.  He died of cancer at Mercy Hospital in Miami and is buried in Woodlawn Park Cemetery and Mausoleum (now Caballero Rivero Woodlawn North Park Cemetery and Mausoleum) in Miami, Florida.

References
 The Miami Herald - Francisco Prio Dies, February 23, 1988, 1-B
 Miami New Times - Dynasty, October 10, 1996
 Libro de Oro de la Sociedad Habanera 1949, (Editorial Lex) 
 Libro de Oro de la Sociedad Habanera 1950, (Editorial Lex) 
 Los Propietarios de Cuba 1958, Guillermo Jimenez Soler (Havana, Cuba: Editorial de Ciencias Sociales, 2007) 

Government ministers of Cuba
1901 births
1986 deaths
Cuban senators
20th-century Cuban lawyers
Cuban expatriates in the United States